Anne White was the defending champion but lost in the first round to Elly Hakami.

Manuela Maleeva won in the final 6–3, 4–6, 6–2 against Dianne Van Rensburg.

Seeds
A champion seed is indicated in bold text while text in italics indicates the round in which that seed was eliminated.

  Manuela Maleeva (champion)
  Patty Fendick (second round)
  Neige Dias (second round)
  Rosalyn Fairbank (quarterfinals)
  Dianne Balestrat (first round)
  Peanut Louie-Harper (first round)
 n/a
  Terry Phelps (quarterfinals)

Draw

References
 1988 Virginia Slims of Arizona Draw

Virginia Slims of Arizona
1988 WTA Tour